Charles Mark-Lee Kirk (May 16, 1895 – December 10, 1969) was an American art director. He was nominated for three Academy Awards in the category of Best Art Direction. He worked on 52 films between 1936 and 1959.

Selected filmography
Kirk was nominated for three Academy Awards for Best Art Direction:
 My Favorite Wife (1940)
 George Washington Slept Here (1942)
 Since You Went Away (1944)

References

External links

 (same person; duplicate IMDb listing under "aka" name)

1895 births
1969 deaths
American art directors
Artists from Pittsburgh